Butel is a neighbourhood in the city of Skopje, North Macedonia, and the seat of Butel Municipality.

Demographics

According to the 2021 census, the town had a total of 24.391 inhabitants. Ethnic groups in the town include:

In the aftermath of the 2001 insurgency some Macedonians from Čair moved to other Skopje urban areas such as nearby Butel. The neighborhood has a mixed population that includes minorities of Romani and Turks, yet Butel is associated with Albanians in North Macedonia.

References

External links

Butel Municipality
Neighbourhoods of Skopje